In hyperbolic geometry, the order-5 cubic honeycomb is one of four compact regular space-filling tessellations (or honeycombs) in hyperbolic 3-space. With Schläfli symbol  it has five cubes  around each edge, and 20 cubes around each vertex. It is dual with the order-4 dodecahedral honeycomb.

Description

Symmetry 
It has a radial subgroup symmetry construction with dodecahedral fundamental domains: Coxeter notation: [4,(3,5)*], index 120.

Related polytopes and honeycombs 

The order-5 cubic honeycomb has a related alternated honeycomb,  ↔ , with icosahedron and tetrahedron cells.

The honeycomb is also one of four regular compact honeycombs in 3D hyperbolic space:

There are fifteen uniform honeycombs in the [5,3,4] Coxeter group family, including the order-5 cubic honeycomb as the regular form:

The order-5 cubic honeycomb is in a sequence of regular polychora and honeycombs with icosahedral vertex figures.

It is also in a sequence of regular polychora and honeycombs with cubic cells. The first polytope in the sequence is the tesseract, and the second is the Euclidean cubic honeycomb.

Rectified order-5 cubic honeycomb 

The rectified order-5 cubic honeycomb, has alternating icosahedron and cuboctahedron cells, with a pentagonal prism vertex figure.

Related honeycomb

There are four rectified compact regular honeycombs:

Truncated order-5 cubic honeycomb 

The truncated order-5 cubic honeycomb, has truncated cube and icosahedron cells, with a pentagonal pyramid vertex figure.

It can be seen as analogous to the 2D hyperbolic truncated order-5 square tiling, t{4,5}, with truncated square and pentagonal faces:
 

It is similar to the Euclidean (order-4) truncated cubic honeycomb, t{4,3,4}, which has octahedral cells at the truncated vertices.

Related honeycombs

Bitruncated order-5 cubic honeycomb 

The bitruncated order-5 cubic honeycomb is the same as the bitruncated order-4 dodecahedral honeycomb.

Cantellated order-5 cubic honeycomb 

The cantellated order-5 cubic honeycomb, has rhombicuboctahedron, icosidodecahedron, and pentagonal prism cells, with a wedge vertex figure.

Related honeycombs
It is similar to the Euclidean (order-4) cantellated cubic honeycomb, rr{4,3,4}:

Cantitruncated order-5 cubic honeycomb 

The cantitruncated order-5 cubic honeycomb, has truncated cuboctahedron, truncated icosahedron, and pentagonal prism cells, with a mirrored sphenoid vertex figure.

Related honeycombs
It is similar to the Euclidean (order-4) cantitruncated cubic honeycomb, tr{4,3,4}:

Runcinated order-5 cubic honeycomb 

The runcinated order-5 cubic honeycomb or runcinated order-4 dodecahedral honeycomb , has cube, dodecahedron, and pentagonal prism cells, with an irregular triangular antiprism vertex figure.

It is analogous to the 2D hyperbolic rhombitetrapentagonal tiling, rr{4,5},  with square and pentagonal faces:

Related honeycombs
It is similar to the Euclidean (order-4) runcinated cubic honeycomb, t0,3{4,3,4}:

Runcitruncated order-5 cubic honeycomb 

The runcitruncated order-5 cubic honeycomb or runcicantellated order-4 dodecahedral honeycomb, has truncated cube, rhombicosidodecahedron, pentagonal prism, and octagonal prism cells, with an isosceles-trapezoidal pyramid vertex figure.

Related honeycombs
It is similar to the Euclidean (order-4) runcitruncated cubic honeycomb, t0,1,3{4,3,4}:

Runcicantellated order-5 cubic honeycomb 

The runcicantellated order-5 cubic honeycomb is the same as the runcitruncated order-4 dodecahedral honeycomb.

Omnitruncated order-5 cubic honeycomb 

The omnitruncated order-5 cubic honeycomb or omnitruncated order-4 dodecahedral honeycomb, has truncated icosidodecahedron, truncated cuboctahedron, decagonal prism, and octagonal prism cells, with an irregular tetrahedral vertex figure.

Related honeycombs
It is similar to the Euclidean (order-4) omnitruncated cubic honeycomb, t0,1,2,3{4,3,4}:

Alternated order-5 cubic honeycomb 

In 3-dimensional hyperbolic geometry, the alternated order-5 cubic honeycomb is a uniform compact space-filling tessellation (or honeycomb). With Schläfli symbol h{4,3,5}, it can be considered a quasiregular honeycomb, alternating icosahedra and tetrahedra around each vertex in an icosidodecahedron vertex figure.

Related honeycombs
It has 3 related forms: the cantic order-5 cubic honeycomb, the runcic order-5 cubic honeycomb, and the runcicantic order-5 cubic honeycomb, .

Cantic order-5 cubic honeycomb

The cantic order-5 cubic honeycomb is a uniform compact space-filling tessellation (or honeycomb), with Schläfli symbol h2{4,3,5}. It has icosidodecahedron, truncated icosahedron, and truncated tetrahedron cells, with a rectangular pyramid vertex figure.

Runcic order-5 cubic honeycomb

The runcic order-5 cubic honeycomb is a uniform compact space-filling tessellation (or honeycomb), with Schläfli symbol h3{4,3,5}. It has dodecahedron, rhombicosidodecahedron, and tetrahedron cells, with a triangular frustum vertex figure.

Runcicantic order-5 cubic honeycomb

The runcicantic order-5 cubic honeycomb is a uniform compact space-filling tessellation (or honeycomb), with Schläfli symbol h2,3{4,3,5}. It has truncated dodecahedron, truncated icosidodecahedron, and truncated tetrahedron cells, with an irregular tetrahedron vertex figure.

See also
 Convex uniform honeycombs in hyperbolic space
 Regular tessellations of hyperbolic 3-space

References 
Coxeter, Regular Polytopes, 3rd. ed., Dover Publications, 1973. . (Tables I and II: Regular polytopes and honeycombs, pp. 294-296)
Coxeter, The Beauty of Geometry: Twelve Essays, Dover Publications, 1999  (Chapter 10: Regular honeycombs in hyperbolic space, Summary tables II,III,IV,V, p212-213)
 Norman Johnson Uniform Polytopes, Manuscript
 N.W. Johnson: The Theory of Uniform Polytopes and Honeycombs, Ph.D. Dissertation, University of Toronto, 1966 
 N.W. Johnson: Geometries and Transformations, (2015) Chapter 13: Hyperbolic Coxeter groups

Honeycombs (geometry)